Justice Action is a not-for-profit community organisation based in Sydney, Australia. Justice Action focuses on abuses of authority in the criminal justice and mental health systems in Australia. Founded in 1979 as Prisoner Action, Justice Action is independent of the Australian government and is funded by voluntary donations and the work of the social enterprise, Breakout Media Communications. Justice Action's coordinator is Brett Collins, an ex-prisoner who began with the organisation in 1979 as co-founder. Alongside Collins, Justice Action is run by a team of interns who are university students in law and other degrees.

Campaigns and activities
In operation since 1979, Justice Action is one of the oldest independent prisoners' rights and advocacy services in Australia, and has had a significant impact on the development of criminal justice policy in Australia. It led the creation of various other agencies and organisations, including the Prisoners Legal Service in 1979, following the Nagle Royal Commission into New South Wales Prisons, and the Australian Prisoners Union in 1999.

Justice Action provides ongoing support to prisoners and involuntary mental health patients on a case-by-case basis, with an emphasis on cases that deal with issues of abuse, mistreatment or human rights. Justice Action has mounted recent high-profile campaigns on prison education and access to computers in cells, visitation rights for women prisoners, the prisoners' right to vote, the potential of a prison-based Needle Syringe Program, and the right of involuntary mental health patients to access educational programs, and make decisions concerning their treatment.

Justice Action is regularly invited to attend and present at conferences in Australia and internationally on issues of prison reform, prisoners' rights, and mental health policy.

As a community organisation focused on human rights issues in the justice and mental health sector, Justice Action works with partners nationally and internationally to share information, research, coordinate and conduct campaigns. In Australia, Justice Action works on campaigns in conjunction with other community groups and industry peak-bodies such as the New South Wales Council of Social Services, the New South Wales Teachers Federation, and is a member of the Community Justice Coalition, an Australian community coalition focused on reform in the Justice and Prison Systems. Internationally, the organisation is a member of the International Conference on Penal Abolition (ICOPA), a bi-annual international conference for activists and academics, which Justice Action hosted in 2006 for ICOPA 11 Tasmania.

Publications
Justice Action publishes research and policy papers on issues related to criminal justice reform and mental health policy.

Until 2004 the organisation published a newspaper entitled Framed. Framed was published quarterly for 44 issues and was Australia's only inmate's newspaper. The newspaper was composed of edited contributions from serving Australian prisoners and was distributed to prisons Australia-wide. In 2002, Framed was banned for distribution in New South Wales (NSW) Prisons by Corrective Services NSW, after it claimed the content of Framed would create "disharmony and conflict" within the prison.

In 2012, Justice Action published research papers on Restorative Justice, Cognitive Behavioral Therapy, Remission, and Computers in Cells which were launched at ICOPA 14 in Trinidad and Tobago.

See also

 Human rights abuses
 Incarceration
 Involuntary commitment
 Involuntary treatment
 Judicial system
 Mental health in Australia
 Prisoner abuse
 Prison education

References

External links
 
 Justice Action YouTube channel
 The International Conference on Penal Abolition (ICOPA)
 Breakout Media Communications

Non-profit organisations based in New South Wales
Organisations based in Sydney
Political advocacy groups in Australia
Prison-related organizations
Prison abolition movement